VfB Lübeck is a German association football club playing in Lübeck, Schleswig-Holstein in the country's north. In addition to its football side the 1,000 member sports club also has departments for badminton, women's gymnastics, handball, and table tennis.

History

Foundation to WW II
The earliest origins of the club go back to a pair of predecessor sides; Ballsportverein Vorwärts Lübeck established on 1 April 1919 and Sportvereinigung Polizei Lübeck founded in 1921.

 SV Polizei Lübeck was the local police sports club. In 1931 it was merged with Verein für Rasensport Lübeck, which was the product of the 1923 union of Fußball Club Alemannia 1905 Lübeck and Lübecker Fußball Club Germania 1913. SVP played well enough to earn appearances in the playoff rounds of the senior north German circuit, but did not enjoy any success. VfR made only a single such appearance, in 1924.

BSV Vorwärts Lübeck played in the Arbeiter-Turn- und Sportbund (Worker's Gymnastic and Sport Federation) from its founding until 1933 when it was dismantled by the Nazi regime, which regarded workers sports clubs of the sort as politically undesirable. They won city championships in 1927, 1928, and 1931. The club's membership became part of SVP and the expanded association joined the Gauliga Nordmark, one of sixteen top flight divisions formed in the 1933 reorganization of German football under the Third Reich.

The club was renamed Polizei Sportverein Lübeck in 1935 and played in the Gauliga Nordmark until 1942, with its best results coming as third-place finishes. PSV made unsuccessful qualification round appearances in play for the Tschammerpokal, predecessor of today's DFB-Pokal (German Cup) in 1936–38. In 1942 the club was again renamed, becoming Sportgemeinschaft der Ordnungspolizei Lübeck, and moved to the Gauliga Schleswig-Holstein when wartime conditions forced the breakup of the Gauliga Nordmark into three more local divisions.

Post-war era to present

Following World War II organizations throughout Germany, including sports and football clubs, were dissolved by occupying Allied authorities. In 1945 the former memberships of SG OrPo and BSV Vorwärts formed a new association called Verein für Bewegungsspile Lübeck. The new club resumed play in the top flight, first in the Berzirksmeisterschaft Schleswig-Holstein, and then in 1947, in the newly formed Oberliga Nord. Over the next decade and a half VfB bounced up and down between first and second division play; they were consistently a top performer in the Amateurliga Schlewig-Holstein (II), but completely incapable of escaping the basement of the Oberliga Nord (I).

Following the 1963 formation of the Bundesliga, the country's professional first division circuit, the team settled into the Regionalliga Nord (II), generally earning mid-table results. A second-place finish in 1969 led VfB to the qualification round for the Bundesliga, where they finished last in their group with only a single point from eight matches.

After 1974, VfB slipped from the ranks of second-tier teams to fourth division Landesliga Schleswig-Holstein. They recovered a place in the 2. Bundesliga just over two decades later and resumed their role as an "elevator side", moving frequently between the second and third divisions. In 2004, the team reached the semi-finals of the DFB-Pokal (German Cup), but lost to Werder Bremen in extra time. After it was revealed that the club has been suffering from financial difficulties, it finally filed for bankruptcy at the district court Lübeck in April 2008 and was eventually forcibly relegated to the Schleswig-Holstein-Liga (V) for the 2013–14 season. After a league championship at this level and success in the promotion round the club returned to the Regionalliga (IV) in 2014. They followed up a second place finish in 2019 with a division title in 2020 and advanced to play in the 3. Liga (III).

In July 2009, VfB Lübeck shocked Bundesliga club 1. FSV Mainz 05, beating them 2–1 after extra time in the first round of the DFB-Pokal. They were eliminated in the next round by VfB Stuttgart (3–1) after again taking a Bundesliga club into extra time. Consecutive Schleswig-Holstein-Pokal wins in 2016 and 2017, and another in 2019, led to additional DFB-Pokal appearances where the club went out in the first round each time.

Honours
The club's honours:
 Regionalliga Nord (III)
 Champions: 1995, 2002
 Regionalliga Nord (IV)
 Champions: 2020
 Schleswig-Holstein-Liga (II/III/IV/V)
 Champions: 1951, 1952, 1955, 1957, 1975, 1977, 1987, 1989, 1990, 1992, 1993, 2004‡, 2014, 2016
 Schleswig-Holstein Cup (Tiers III-V)
 Winners: 1956, 1987, 1992, 1998, 1999, 2000, 2001, 2006, 2009, 2010, 2012, 2015, 2016, 2019, 2022
 ‡ Denotes won by reserve team.

Players

Current squad

Former players

  Jerzy Wijas
Matei Boldor
  Ali Dia

References

External links
 
VfB Lübeck-Fanclub Berlin 
The Abseits guide to German Soccer

 
Sport in Lübeck
Football clubs in Germany
Football clubs in Schleswig-Holstein
Association football clubs established in 1919
1919 establishments in Germany
2. Bundesliga clubs
3. Liga clubs